Taulant Balla (born 12 August 1977) is an Albanian Socialist Party politician and Member of Parliament (MP) for Librazhd. He was first elected MP in the 2005 general election. He is the General Secretary of the Socialist Party.

Political career

Political activities
He was first elected MP in the 2005 general election and then for two other legislatures successively as a member of the parliamentary group of the Socialist Party.

He is the political leader for the Socialist Party in Fier.

In 2020, Balla proposed a measure to adopt the International Holocaust Remembrance Alliance’s definition of anti-Semitism and promise to fight anti-Jewish prejudice. The measure was accepted unanimously by the Parliament of Albania, and Albania became the first Muslim country to formally adopt the definition.

Plagiarism assertion
In October 2018, many Albanian public figures and politicians were alleged to have been part of a plagiarism scandal, involving their Masters and Ph.D. theses. The assertions were begun by Taulant Muka, a young epidemiologist educated in the Netherlands. The assertions sparked nationwide protests from students of public universities, leading to a vetting for all academic titles held by public figures, state officials, and politicians. The PhD thesis of Balla, entitled The Reform of Decision-Making System in the European Union, supervised by Professor George Poede at Alexandru Ioan Cuza University in Iaşi, Romania, was named in the scandal. In 2019, following an accusation of plagiarism, the university forwarded the charge to the consultative body of the ministry of national education that investigates such accusations.

Personal life
Balla is married to Iris Pekmezi and has two children, a  boy, Robin and a girl, Melani.
Balla is a supporter of German football club Bayern Munich.

References

External links 
Parliament of Albania Official Website
Socialist Party of Albania Official Website

Socialist Party of Albania politicians
Members of the Parliament of Albania
21st-century Albanian politicians
1977 births
Living people
Alexandru Ioan Cuza University alumni
People from Librazhd